Lithocarpus havilandii is a tree in the beech family Fagaceae. It is named for the British surgeon and naturalist George Darby Haviland.

Description
The greyish brown bark is smooth, flaky or lenticellate. The flowers are solitary on the rachis.

Distribution and habitat
Lithocarpus havilandii grows naturally in Borneo and Sulawesi.

References

havilandii
Trees of Borneo
Trees of Sulawesi
Plants described in 1894